Colla similis is a moth in the Bombycidae family. It was described by Felder in 1868. It is found in the Neotropical realm.

References

Natural History Museum Lepidoptera generic names catalog

Bombycidae
Moths described in 1868